MEPCO may refer to:

 Mepco Schlenk Engineering College
 Metal Powder Company
 Multan Electric Power Company